Courtney Abbot (born 15 November 1989) is a New Zealand-born actress who is known for her lead role as Maxine on the New Zealand teen situation comedy Girl vs. Boy. Born in Whakatāne and a graduate of Unitec's School of Performing and Screen Arts, she has appeared in a number of film and theatre productions throughout New Zealand.

Filmography

References

External links

1989 births
Living people
New Zealand film actresses
New Zealand television actresses
People from Whakatāne
21st-century New Zealand actresses
Unitec Institute of Technology alumni